The Humber derby is a footballing rivalry between Scunthorpe United, Hull City and Grimsby Town; clubs based in the River Humber region, with Hull based on the north bank in Yorkshire and Scunthorpe and Grimsby on the south bank in Lincolnshire. All three clubs fall into the former county of Humberside.

The derby was first contested on 16 December 1905 when Hull City played Grimsby Town at the Boulevard in Hull.

Statistics
Statistics up-to-date as of 22 December 2019

Total results
Grimsby Town v Hull City

Grimsby Town v Scunthorpe United

Hull City v Scunthorpe United

Overall results

Recent meetings

References 

England football derbies
Football in the East Riding of Yorkshire
Football in Lincolnshire
Grimsby Town F.C.
Hull City A.F.C.
Scunthorpe United F.C.